Conservative Alliance may refer to:

 Conservative Alliance (Fiji)
 Conservative Alliance (Nicaragua)